Kaalangalil Aval Vasantham is a 1976 Indian Tamil-language film directed by S. P. Muthuraman and produced by S. Baskar. The screenplay was written by Panchu Arunachalam from a story by C. N. Muthu. The film stars R. Muthuraman, Chandrakala and Srividya. It was released on 13 April 1976. The film was remade in Kannada as Hrudaya Pallavi (1987).

Plot 
It's the story of 2 sisters, Rajalakshmi (Raji), and Kalpana. They live with their father, and is often visited by their uncle Santhanam from Singapore. Kalpana, the younger one is in love with Ravi. The elder sister is about to be married, when fate has it that the groom unfortunately passes away in an accident, leaving her mentally troubled obsessing herself with marriage and groom. On the persuasion of her father, kalpana is asked to marry in the hope that at least his younger daughter would be happy. With initial hesitance she later agrees. Soon after she is married her father passes away leaving the mentally challenged sister in her and his son in law's responsibility.

The three of them shift to Ooty, where situations gets worse and it gets difficult to look after her sister. They consult a psychiatrist who says that she has a superficial disorder, which could be cured by getting her married since the cause for this trouble was due to the marriage that didn't take place. No one wishes to marry the mentally challenged Raji.

Troubled, kalpana decides to get her husband, Ravi, married to her sister. After initially disapproving Ravi gets married to Raji for the sake of his wife. This slowly heals Raji. She believes that Ravi is her husband and one fine day she is completely cured and even gets back her memory. Kalpana is rejoiced to see her sister back to her normal self. She tells her what happened but deliberately conceals the truth that she got her husband married to her sister. Things get ugly when Raji finds that her husband is having an affair with her sister. Her uncle too comes to visit her and she confides to him about her Ill fate. He knowing the truth but is helpless.

When Ravi is fatally injured, kalpana in panic starts hospitalising her husband forgetting that her sister is in their vicinity. Raji is shocked to find out that her sister is married and is the wife of her husband. She pretends to be mentally deranged and goes away with her uncle to Singapore.

Cast 
 R. Muthuraman as Ravi
 Chandrakala as Kalpana
 Srividya as Raji
 S. A. Ashokan as Santhanam
 Senthamarai
 Jeyachandran
 Thengai Srinivasan
 Manorama as Kalyani
 A. Sakunthala as Radha
 Vijayakumar as Kumar (cameo)

Soundtrack 
Music was by Vijaya Bhaskar. The song "Anbenum Sudaral" is set to the Carnatic raga Poorvikalyani.

Reception 
Kanthan of Kalki appreciated Muthuraman's direction and cast performances, especially Srividya's, but felt Muthuraman was underutilised and criticised the writing.

References

External links 
 

1970s Tamil-language films
1976 films
Films about sisters
Films directed by S. P. Muthuraman
Films scored by Vijaya Bhaskar
Indian black-and-white films
Tamil films remade in other languages